Tokyo 9th district was a constituency of the House of Representatives in the Imperial Diet of Japan (national legislature) between 1890 and 1898. It was located in Tokyo and consisted of Tokyo City's Koishikawa, Ushigome and Yotsuya wards.

After losing narrowly in 1890, former Tokyo prefectural representative Hatoyama Kazuo represented Tokyo 9th district from the 1892 election until its dissolution in 1902. He was unchallenged in the 1894 and 1898 elections.

Election results

References 

Districts of the House of Representatives (Japan)